Andreas is both a surname and a given name. Notable people with the name include:

 Andreas (comics) (b. 1951),  pen name for Andreas Martens, comic artist
 Andreas (parish), a parish in the Sheading of Ayre, Isle of Man
 Andreas, Isle of Man, the main village of the parish
 Andreas (poem), an Old English poem
 Andreas (typeface), a humanist serif typeface designed by Michael Harvey